John Smrke (born February 25, 1956) is a Canadian-born American former professional ice hockey player who played 103 games in the National Hockey League with the St. Louis Blues and Quebec Nordiques between 1977 and 1980.

Smrke was born in Chicoutimi, Quebec and raised in Rochester, New York. His father was former NHLer Stan Smrke. He lived in Toronto while his father played in Rochester, and would occasionally visit during the season. As a youth, Smrke played in the 1969 Quebec International Pee-Wee Hockey Tournament with the Scarboro Lions minor ice hockey team.

Career statistics

Regular season and playoffs

References

External links
 
Hockey Draft Central

1956 births
Living people
American men's ice hockey left wingers
American people of Serbian descent
American people of Slovenian descent
Anglophone Quebec people
Binghamton Whalers players
Canadian expatriate ice hockey players in Slovenia
Canadian ice hockey centres
Canadian people of Serbian descent
Canadian people of Slovenian descent
Cincinnati Tigers players
Canadian expatriate ice hockey players in Italy
Houston Apollos players
Ice hockey people from Quebec
Ice hockey players from New York (state)
Kansas City Blues players
Sportspeople from Rochester, New York
Sportspeople from Saguenay, Quebec
Quebec Nordiques players
Salt Lake Golden Eagles (CHL) players
San Diego Mariners draft picks
St. Louis Blues draft picks
St. Louis Blues players
Syracuse Firebirds players
Toronto Marlboros players
American expatriate ice hockey players in Italy